On Monday 6 May 2019 the body of Julie Van Espen (27 February 1996 – 4 May 2019), a 23-year-old Belgian woman, was found in the Albert Canal in Antwerp. That same day, police arrested 39-year-old Steve Bakelmans on suspicion of her murder; in custody, he confessed that he had killed her after attempting to rape her. The case has led to political protests against sexual violence.

Events
On Saturday, 4 May 2019, in Antwerp, Belgium, according to reports, 39-year-old Steve Bakelmans, wanting to rape a random person, saw 23-year-old Julie Van Espen riding her bicycle. He pulled her off the bicycle and tried to rape her. When she fought back, he beat her until she stopped moving and strangled her. Leaving her body on the side of the road, he took her bicycle basket with him and walked to the training center of the Antwerp Giants. He was captured on CCTV; this footage was later used to trace him. Bakelmans dumped Van Espen's travel pass in one of the bins of the complex. Because her bicycle basket did not fit into the bin, he hid it in an alley. Later that night, he dumped her body in the Albert Canal along with her bicycle and her mobile phone. The body was found in the canal on 6 May. Some of Van Espen's clothing was found in the grass.

On the day Van Espen's body was found, Bakelmans was arrested by police in Leuven after the CCTV images were published in a public appeal as part of the investigation into Van Espen's death. In custody, he confessed to having killed her. He had previously served four-and-a-half years in prison for a series of offences, including rape, and, in 2016, he had been remanded again on suspicion of theft and rape, later being sentenced to four years' imprisonment. He had appealed and the case had been indefinitely postponed in November 2018. After he was arrested on suspicion of having killed Van Espen, police and prosecutors announced that they intended to use Bakelmans's DNA in order to see if they could link him to cold cases.

Aftermath
The day after his arrest, Bakelmans' Facebook account was deleted due to hundreds of people sending him hateful messages. Minister of Justice Koen Geens cancelled the Midsummer party planned in Leuven "out of respect and compassion for the parents, family and social network of Julie" on 8 May. Social media users, including singer Belle Pérez and psychologist Goedele Liekens, condemned the assault on Van Espen, with hashtags such as "#enough", "#MeToo" and "#JulieVanEspen" being used to command attention to the case, to raise awareness on sexual violence, and to address that Bakelmans had been walking free while being convicted of rape twice before. Over 15,000 people walked in a silent march in Antwerp for Van Espen on 12 May. The "Partij voor de Poëzie" hung posters in locations around Belgium where women felt sexually intimidated, to denounce sexual violence.

On 18 May, over 2000 people attended Van Espen's funeral: seven hundred relatives, friends and acquaintances inside the church, and around 1600 people following the service outside. During the church ceremony, relatives of Van Espen made a public request to change the name of the bridge near which her body was found to "Zonnebrug" in her memory.

See also
List of solved missing person cases

References

2010s missing person cases
Events in Antwerp
Female murder victims
May 2019 events in Belgium
Missing person cases in Belgium
Violence against women in Belgium